The Sheikh Zayed Mosque, Fujairah, is the main mosque in the Emirate of Fujairah, and the second largest in the United Arab Emirates (UAE) after the mosque with the same name in Abu Dhabi.

History
The mosque opened in 2015, and Fujairah's ruler, Sheikh Hamad bin Mohammed Al Sharqi, led the first Eid prayers.

Geography
The mosque is located on Mohammed bin Matar Road in central Fujairah City.

Structure
Similar in appearance to the Blue Mosque in Istanbul, this large white mosque is a landmark that is visible from many locations in the centre of the city. It can hold around 28,000 worshippers, and measures . The courtyard of the mosque, with fountains and gardens, can hold 14,000 people.

See also
 Islam in the United Arab Emirates
 List of mosques in the United Arab Emirates
 Sheikh Zayed Mosque, Abu Dhabi

References

External links

 Sheikh Zayed Mosque Fujairah (YouTube)
 Citylifetravels: Sheikh Zayed Grand Mosque, Fujairah, United Arab Emirates (Facebook)
 Sheikh Zayed Mosque – Mosque in Fujairah City (Lonely Planet)

2015 establishments in the United Arab Emirates
21st-century mosques
Mosques completed in 2015
Mosques in the Emirate of Fujairah
Mosque buildings with domes
Fujairah City